In 1973, Andrey Kolmogorov proposed a non-probabilistic approach to statistics and model selection. Let each datum be a finite binary string and a model be a finite set of binary strings. Consider model classes consisting of models of given maximal Kolmogorov complexity.
The Kolmogorov structure function of an individual data string expresses the relation between the complexity level constraint on a model class and the least log-cardinality of a model in the class containing the data. The structure function determines all stochastic properties of the individual data string: for every constrained model class it determines the individual best-fitting model in the class irrespective of whether the true model is in the model class considered or not. In the classical case we talk about a set of data with a probability distribution, and the properties are those of the expectations. In contrast, here we deal with individual data strings and the properties of the individual string focused on. In this setting, a property holds with certainty rather than with high probability as in the classical case. The Kolmogorov structure function precisely quantifies the goodness-of-fit of an individual model with respect to individual data.

The Kolmogorov structure function is used in the algorithmic information theory, also known as the theory of Kolmogorov complexity, for describing the structure of a string by use of models of increasing complexity.

Kolmogorov's definition

The structure function was originally proposed by Kolmogorov in 1973 at a Soviet Information Theory symposium in Tallinn, but these results were not published p. 182. But the results were announced in in 1974, the only written record by Kolmogorov himself. One of his last scientific statements is (translated from the original Russian by L.A. Levin):

Contemporary definition
It is discussed in Cover and Thomas. It is extensively studied in Vereshchagin and Vitányi where also the main properties are resolved.
The Kolmogorov structure function  can be written as
 

The algorithmic sufficient statistic
We define a set  containing  such that 
.
The function  never decreases more than a fixed independent constant below the diagonal called sufficiency line L defined by 
.
We write `algorithmic' for `Kolmogorov complexity' by convention.
.
This can be easily seen as follows: 
,
 using straightforward inequalities and the sufficiency property, we find that . (For example, given , we can describe  self-delimitingly (you can determine its end) in  bits.) The algorithmic sufficient statistic associated with the least such  is called the algorithmic minimal sufficient statistic.

With respect to the picture: The MDL structure function  is explained below. The Goodness-of-fit structure function  is the least randomness deficiency (see above) of any model  for  such that . This structure function gives the goodness-of-fit of a model  (containing x) for the string x. When it is low the model fits well, and when it is high the model doesn't fit well. For more details see and especially and.

Selection of properties
Where the graph hits the diagonal first the argument (complexity) is that of the minimum sufficient statistic. It is incomputable to determine this place. See.

Main property

The MDL variant
The Minimum description length (MDL) function: The length of the minimal two-part code for x consisting of the model cost K(S) and the
 

where  is the total length of two-part code of x with help of model S.

Main property

Application in statistics
The mathematics developed above were taken as the foundation of MDL by its inventor Jorma Rissanen.

Probability models
For every computable probability distribution  it can be proved that
 .
For example, if  is some computable distribution on the set  of strings of length , then each  has probability . Kolmogorov's structure function becomes 
 
Then . For every complexity level  the function   is the Kolmogorov complexity version of the maximum likelihood (ML).

Main property

The MDL variant and probability models
The MDL function: The length of the minimal two-part code for x consisting of the model cost K(P) and the
 

where  is the total length of two-part code of x with help of model P.

Main property

Extension to rate distortion and denoising
It turns out that the approach can be extended to a theory of rate distortion of individual finite sequences 
and denoising of individual finite sequences using Kolmogorov complexity. Experiments using real compressor programs have been carried out with success. Here the assumption is that for natural data the Kolmogorov complexity is not far from the length of a compressed version using a good compressor.

References

Literature
 
 
 , Especially pp. 401–431 about the Kolmogorov structure function, and pp. 613–629 about rate distortion and denoising of individual sequences.
 

Algorithmic information theory